is a Japanese actress, voice actress and narrator. She graduated from Otemae Women's University in Nishinomiya. She is affiliated with Production Baobab.

Her notable roles include Ayumu "Osaka" Kasuga in Azumanga Daioh, Orihime Inoue in Bleach, Tsuruya in The Melancholy of Haruhi Suzumiya, and Alisa Bosconovitch in Tekken.

Filmography

Main current role

Anime series

OVA

Films

Video games

Drama CDs

References 

Maeda, Hisashi. "The Official Art of The Melancholy of Haruhi Suzumiya". (November 2007) Newtype USA. pp. 133–139.

External links 
 Official agency profile 
 Yuki Matsuoka at GamePlaza-Haruka Voice Acting Database 
 Yuki Matsuoka at Hitoshi Doi's Seiyuu Database
 
 

1970 births
Living people
Japanese child actresses
Japanese television personalities
Japanese video game actresses
Japanese voice actresses
Production Baobab voice actors
Voice actresses from Osaka
20th-century Japanese actresses
21st-century Japanese actresses